Rocafort station may refer to:

 Rocafort station (Barcelona), a rapid transit station on metro  line L1 in Barcelona, Catalonia, Spain
 Rocafort station (Valencia), a rapid transit station on metro  line 1 in the Valencia, Valencian Community, Spain